Sir Harold Winter Atcherley (30 August 1918 – 29 January 2017) was a businessman, public figure and arts administrator in the United Kingdom.

Early life
The son of L. W. Atcherley and his wife Maude Lester Nash, Atcherley was educated at Gresham's School, Holt, Geneva University, and Heidelberg University.

Career
Atcherley joined Royal Dutch Shell in 1937. From 1939, he served through the Second World War in the Queen's Westminster Rifles (1939–1940) and the Intelligence Corps, 1940, then in the 18th Infantry Division in Singapore. After the fall of Singapore in 1942 he became a prisoner of war of the Japanese and worked on the Burma Railway until the war ended in 1945, then in 1946 he returned to Royal Dutch Shell. With that company he served in Egypt, Lebanon, Syria, Argentina, and Brazil until 1959 and was the RDS Group's Personnel co-ordinator from 1964 until 1970.

He was Recruitment Advisor to the Ministry of Defence, 1970–1971, and Chairman of Tyzack & Partners, 1979–1985. He was also a director of British Home Stores, 1973–1987. In retirement, as of 2008 he lived in London. Atcherley died on 29 January 2017, aged 98.

Appointments
Chairman, Armed Forces' Pay Review Body (1971–1982)
Chairman, Police Negotiating Board (1983–1986)
Member, Top Salaries Review Body, 1971–1987
Chairman, Aldeburgh Festival, 1989–1994 
Chairman, Toynbee Hall, 1985–1990 (Member of Management Committee, 1979–1990)
Member, National Staff Committee for Nurses and Midwives, 1973–1977
Member, Committee of Inquiry into Pay and Related Conditions of Service of Nurses, 1974
Member, Committee of Inquiry into Remuneration of Members of Local Authorities, 1977
Vice-Chairman, Suffolk Wildlife Trust, 1987–1990
Member of Management Committee, Suffolk Rural Housing Association, 1984–1987
Chairman, Suffolk and North Essex Branch, European Movement, 1995–1998, and President since 1998

Honours
Empress Leopoldina Medal (Brazil), 1958
Knighthood, 1977 Silver Jubilee and Birthday Honours

Family
Atcherley married first, in 1946, Anita Helen Leslie. They had one son and two daughters and divorced in 1990. He married secondly, in 1990, Elke Jessett, the daughter of Carl Langbehn (she died in 2004). He married thirdly, in 2005, Sarah Mordant.

Publications
War Diary: Singapore, Siam & Burma, 1941-1945, illustrated by Ronald Searle (London, Harold Atcherley, 2004)
Euro paean: In 1998, Atcherley wrote in The Independent in support of Britain joining the European single currency.
In the aftermath of the 9/11 attack on the World Trade Center, Atcherley, writing in The Independent, ascribed the fundamental causes of the disaster to the non-observation by the British government of the Balfour Declaration. He wrote to The Times on 3 August 2006: "How can the Israelis, Bush and Blair think they can ever achieve lasting peace in the Middle East by allowing Israel to continue its futile attempt to 'defeat' Hezbollah? ...Unless military action is replaced by negotiation, I can only see disastrous consequences for our relations with the Muslim world."
On 6 September 2001, a letter from Atcherley was published in London's The Independent newspaper, headed Reports of my death... and enquiring why for two years running the newspaper had failed to include his name in its Today's Birthdays column. He suggested:

His birthday, however, has continued to be reported in The Times.

References

Aldeburgh Productions (formerly the Aldeburgh Foundation - official site
Letter to The Independent, 24 September 1996
 Badische-Zeitung.de

1918 births
2017 deaths
People educated at Gresham's School
Heidelberg University alumni
University of Geneva alumni
British Army personnel of World War II
World War II prisoners of war held by Japan
Intelligence Corps officers
Shell plc people
Knights Bachelor
Burma Railway prisoners
British expatriates in Germany
British expatriates in Switzerland
British expatriates in Myanmar
British expatriates in Egypt
British expatriates in Syria
British expatriates in Lebanon
British expatriates in Brazil
British expatriates in Argentina
British World War II prisoners of war
Queen's Westminsters officers